Dead Kids may refer to:

 Dead Kids (film), 2019 film
 "Dead Kids" (South Park), 2018 TV episode
 Strange Behavior, also known as Dead Kids, a 1981 slasher film

See also
 Dead Boys (disambiguation)
 Dead Girl (disambiguation)